General elections were held in Papua and New Guinea on 2 October 1954.

Electoral system
The 29-member Legislative Council consisted of the Administrator, 16 civil servants, nine members appointed by the Administrator (three representatives of the indigenous population, three representing European settlers and three representing missionaries) and three elected Europeans. The Chinese community were also given the right to vote alongside Europeans. However, although there were around 13,000 Europeans and 2,000 Chinese in the territory, only around 2,700 people registered to vote.

The three elected members were elected from three single-member constituencies, New Guinea Islands, New Guinea Mainland and Papua by preferential voting. Voting was not compulsory.

Campaign
Nominations for the three elected seats closed on 9 August, with five candidates put forward. The New Guinea Islands seat was contested by the incumbent Don Barrett and John Stokie, a plantation manager. In New Guinea Mainland, the incumbent Carl Jacobsen did not run, resulting in a contest between the theatre owner Harry Starr and optometrist and planter George Whittaker. Incumbent MLC Ernest James was the only candidate in Papua.

Results

Appointed members

Aftermath
In March 1955 Frank Lee was replaced by Thomas Grahamslaw. Later in the year missionary representative Frank George Lewis left the territory and was replaced in the Council by Philip Strong.

References

Elections in Papua New Guinea
Papua
1954 in Papua New Guinea
Politics of Papua and New Guinea
October 1954 events in Oceania